Callum James Rzonca (born 7 January 1997) is an English professional footballer who plays as a midfielder or winger.

Rzonca played in the youth teams at Huddersfield Town and Barnsley before started his senior career with York City in 2015. He was loaned out to Stamford and Harrogate Town before being released by York in 2017.

Career

York City
Rzonca was born in Leeds, West Yorkshire, and started his career with the youth systems of Huddersfield Town and Barnsley. He started an apprenticeship with York City in 2013, and signed a one-year professional contract with the club in May 2015. Rzonca made his first-team debut on 25 August 2015 as a 71st-minute substitute for Vadaine Oliver in York's 3–0 away defeat to Premier League team Swansea City in the League Cup second round. He joined Northern Premier League Premier Division club Stamford on 15 March 2016 on a one-month loan, making his debut the same day as a 75th-minute substitute in a 4–1 home defeat to Darlington 1883. Rzonca made nine appearances as Stamford were relegated in 21st place in the Northern Premier League Premier Division. He finished the 2015–16 season with two appearances for York, as they were relegated into the National League in 24th place in League Two. He signed a new one-year contract in June 2016.

Rzonca joined National League North club Harrogate Town on 20 January 2017 on a one-month loan. He made his debut on 28 January 2017 as a 71st-minute substitute in a 3–1 home defeat to Gainsborough Trinity. This was Rzonca's only appearance for Harrogate before returning to York. He was released by York at the end of 2016–17.

Later career
Rzonca signed for newly relegated National League North club North Ferriby United on 28 July 2017 after a successful trial. In January 2018, Rzonca joined Polish side Zagłębie Sosnowiec and was part of the side which achieved promotion to the Ekstraklasa. On 22 January 2019, after a year with Zagłębie, he joined I liga side GKS Katowice on a deal until the end of the season with the option of an additional year. He left the club at the end of the season.

Style of play
Rzonca plays a central midfielder or a left winger.

Career statistics

Honours
Zagłębie Sosnowiec
I liga runner-up: 2017–18

References

External links
Callum Rzonca profile at the Zagłębie Sosnowiec website

1997 births
Living people
Footballers from Leeds
English footballers
Association football midfielders
Association football wingers
Huddersfield Town A.F.C. players
Barnsley F.C. players
York City F.C. players
Stamford A.F.C. players
Harrogate Town A.F.C. players
North Ferriby United A.F.C. players
Zagłębie Sosnowiec players
GKS Katowice players
English Football League players
Northern Premier League players
National League (English football) players
I liga players
Ekstraklasa players
English expatriate footballers
Expatriate footballers in Poland
English expatriate sportspeople in Poland